Peking University (abbreviated PKU or Beida) is a public research university in Beijing, China. The university is funded by the Ministry of Education of China. A successor of the older Guozijian Imperial College, it was established as the Imperial University of Peking in 1898 when it received its royal charter by the Guangxu Emperor. 

Throughout its history, Peking University has had an important role "at the center of major intellectual movements" in China. After the fall of the Qing dynasty and the Xinhai Revolution, its status as a royal institution was abolished. From the early 1920s, the university became a center for China's emerging, progressive, and republican movements. Faculty and students held important roles in originating the New Culture Movement, the May Fourth Movement protests, and other significant cultural and sociopolitical events, to the extent that the university's history has been closely tied to that of modern China. Peking University has educated and hosted many prominent modern Chinese figures, including Mao Zedong, Lu Xun, Gu Hongming, Hu Shih, Mao Dun, Li Dazhao, Chen Duxiu, and current Premier Li Keqiang.

Peking University is a member of the C9 League, Double First Class University Plan, former Project 985 and former Project 211. The university library contains over 8 million volumes. The university also operates the PKU Hall, a professional performing arts center, and the Arthur M. Sackler Museum of Arts and Archaeology. The university is also renowned for its campus grounds and the beauty of its traditional Chinese architecture. Additionally, it hosts one of the only undergraduate liberal arts colleges in Asia, and is a Class A institution under the Chinese Double First Class University program. Peking University's staff include 76 members of the Chinese Academy of Sciences, 19 members of the Chinese Academy of Engineering and 25 members of the World Academy of Sciences.

The university is perennially ranked as one of the top academic institutions in China and the world. As of 2021, Peking University was ranked 16th globally and 1st in the Asia-Pacific & emerging countries by Times Higher Education, while as of 2022 it was ranked 12th globally, 2nd in Asia, and 1st in China by QS University Rankings.

History

Establishment
Following China's defeat in the Sino-Japanese War, intellectuals - including Kang Youwei, Liang Qichao, and Yan Fu - called for reforms to the country's education system. In June 1896, Minister Li Duanfen proposed to create a university in the capital. On 11 June 1898, the Guangxu Emperor, as part of the Hundred Days' Reform, authorised the creation of the Imperial University of Peking. The Imperial University was formally established on 3 July 1898 when the emperor approved the royal charter written by Liang. Minister Sun Jianai was charged with the implementation. IUP served as the country's foremost institute for higher learning, but also as its highest educational authority. William Alexander Parsons Martin was appointed as the first president. Most of the reforms were abolished when the conservative Empress Dowager Cixi seized power on 21 September. The university survived with altered objectives and reduced scope. It opened on 31 December with 160 students, instead of the planned 500.

In 1900, the university was paralyzed by the Boxer Rebellion, later in the year, the "Eight-Power Allied Forces" (八国联军) entered Beijing and the university's operation was continually suspended. In 1902, "Jingshi Tongwenguan", a school established by the Qing court in 1862 for foreign language learning was incorporated into the Imperial University of Peking. In 1904, the university sent 47 students to study abroad, which marked the first time for Chinese higher education institution to send students to foreign countries.

Following the Xinhai Revolution, the Imperial University of Peking was renamed "Government University of Peking" in 1912 and then "National University of Peking" in 1919.

Early Republic of China period (1916–1927) 
The noted scholar Cai Yuanpei was appointed president on January 4, 1917, and helped transform Peking University into the country's largest institution of higher learning, with 14 departments and an enrollment of more than 2,000 students. President Cai, inspired by the German model of academic freedom, introduced faculty governance and democratic management to the university. Cai recruited an intellectually diverse faculty that included some of the most prominent figures in the progressive New Culture Movement, including Hu Shih, Liu Bannong, Ma Yinchu, Li Dazhao, Chen Duxiu, Lu Xun and Liang Shuming. Meanwhile, leading conservatives Gu Hongming and Huang Kan also taught at the university. A firm supporter for freedom of thought, Cai advocated for educational independence and resigned several times protesting the government's policy and interference. 

On May 1, 1919, some students of Peking University learned that the Treaty of Versailles would allow Japan to receive Germany's colonising rights in Shandong province. An assembly at Peking University that included these students and representatives from other universities in Beijing was quickly organised. On May 4, students from thirteen universities marched to Tiananmen to protest the terms of Treaty of Versailles, demanded the Beiyang government to refuse to sign the treaty. Demonstrators also demanded the immediate resignation of three officials: Cao Rulin, Minister of the Ministry of Transportation, Zhang Zongxiang, China's Ambassador to Japan and Lu Zongyu, Minister of Currency, who they believed were in cooperation with Japanese. The protest ended up with some protesters being beaten and arrested, and Cao Rulin's house burned by protesters. Following the protest on May 4, students, workers and merchants from nearly all China's major cities went on strike and boycotted Japanese goods in China. The Beiyang government eventually agreed to release the arrested students and fired the three officials under intense public pressure, China's representatives in Paris refused to sign the Treaty of Versailles.

These protests, now known as the May Fourth Movement, has been widely regarded as one of the most important turning points in modern China's history. In its broader sense, the May Fourth Movement led to the establishment of radical Chinese intellectuals who went on to mobilize peasants and workers into the Communist party and gain the organizational strength that would solidify the success of the Communist Revolution.

Following the May Fourth Movement, Chen Duxiu and Li Dazhao cofounded the Chinese Communist Party, and Chen served as its first general secretary. Both Chen and Li served as faculty for Peking. Li served as a head librarian, and Chen served as Peking University's dean.

In 1920, Peking University became the first Chinese university to accept female students.

World War II (1927–1949) 
After the outbreak of the Second Sino-Japanese War in 1937 and the resulting expansion of Japanese territorial control in east China, Peking University was relocated to the southwestern city of Changsha and formed the Changsha Temporary University along with nearby schools Tsinghua University and Nankai University. In 1938, the three schools moved again, this time further southwest to Kunming, and formed the National Southwestern Associated University.

In 1946, after the Japanese surrender in World War II, Peking University moved back to Beijing. At that time, the university comprised six schools (Arts, Science, Law, Medicine, Engineering, and Agriculture), and a research institute for humanities. The total student enrollment grew up to 3,000.

People's Republic of China (1949–1999)
In 1949, after the People's Republic of China was established, Peking University lost its "national" appellation to reflect the fact that all universities under the new socialist state would be public. In 1952, Mao Zedong's government re-grouped the country's higher education institutions with individual institutions tending to specialize in a certain field of study after the Soviet model. As a result, some arts and science faculties of Tsinghua University and former Yenching University were merged into Peking University. At the same time, however, the university lost its Law, Medicine, Engineering and Agriculture schools. These schools and faculties were either merged into other universities or to found new colleges. During the re-grouping, Yenching University was closed up. Peking University moved from downtown Beijing to the former Yenching campus.

The first disturbances of the Cultural Revolution began at Peking University in 1966; education there ceased between 1966 and 1970.

On May 4, 1998, at the 100th anniversary of Peking University, Communist Party General Secretary Jiang Zemin announced that the government would initiate a national project to promote China's higher education by funding selected universities to achieve world-class level. The project was later named “985” based on the date of its announcement.

21st century (2000–present) 
In 2000, Beijing Medical University was merged back into Peking University and became the Peking University Health Science Campus. Beijing Medical University, which used to be Medical School of Peking University, was separated from Peking University in 1952. Peking University now has eight affiliated hospitals and 12 teaching hospitals.

In 2001, Peking University established the Yuanpei Program. It was formalized in 2007 as the Yuanpei College, named in honor of the highly respected former university president Cai Yuanpei. The college hosts an elite undergraduate liberal arts program that allows students to freely choose specialisations. In the same year, Peking University set up a satellite campus for graduate students in Shenzhen. The university's second business school, Peking University HSBC Business School was launched on the Shenzhen campus in 2004.

In 2014, Peking University established the Yenching Academy, a fully funded global fellowship program designed "to cultivate leaders who will advocate for global progress and cultural understanding."

In October 2015, Peking University alumni Professor Tu Youyou was awarded the Nobel Prize in Physiology or Medicine for her discovery of artemisinin. Having saved millions of lives, artemisinin has made significant contributions to global health in regard to the fight against malaria.

In May 2016, the Peking University Department of Psychology was renamed as Peking University School of Psychological and Cognitive Sciences. On July 5, Peking University and Moscow State University signed the Joint Declaration on the Establishment of the Comprehensive University Alliance between the People's Republic of China and the Russian Federation, proposing the establishment of the China-Russia Comprehensive University Alliance. On August 29, Peking University signed a memorandum with the Shenzhen Municipal People's Government to jointly open Peking University Shenzhen Campus. On September 20, Peking University Institute of Humanities and Social Sciences was officially inaugurated.

On February 20, 2017, the university officially signed a contract with the British Open University to establish the Oxford Campus of Peking University HSBC Business School, Peking University Oxford Center and Shenzhen Oxford Innovation Center. In March, the National Engineering Laboratory for Big Data Analysis and Application Technology was unveiled. In September, Peking University was selected as a national "double first-class" university. On December 13, Peking University School of Advanced Agricultural Sciences was established.

On May 4, 2018, Peking University held its 120th  anniversary meeting at the Khoo Teck Puat Gymnasium. On October 24, Peking University led the formation of the medical “Double First-Class” (i.e. world-class universities and first-class disciplines) Construction Alliance, which is the first unofficial non-profit medical higher education and medical discipline construction collaboration organization.

In February 2019, Peking University and the University of Hong Kong signed a cooperation agreement to cooperate in the dual bachelor's degree program in law; in the same month, Peking University and the Chinese University of Hong Kong signed a cooperation agreement to jointly organize undergraduate double-degree programs of Linguistics and Chinese Language and Literature. In December, it joined the “Belt and Road” Think Tank Cooperation Alliance as a governing unit.

In May 2019, Peking University and Beijing Geely University signed an agreement. Peking University will build a new campus on  the original site of Geely Institute in Changping.

On June 29, 2020, the Sino-Russian Mathematics Center was established. The Sino-Russian Mathematics Center is led by Peking University and Moscow State University, and jointly constructed by relevant domestic units and other Russian universities and research institutes such as St. Petersburg University, relying on the “Double First-class” construction alliance in mathematics.

On April 2, 2021, Peking University Nanchang Innovation Research Institute was inaugurated.

On July 15, 2021, Peking University School of Integrated Circuits was inaugurated.

In July 2021, the College of Future Technology at Peking University was officially inaugurated.

On September 6, 2021, the new Changping campus of Peking University was officially opened, welcoming the first batch of teachers and students. The new campus in Changping is the first real large-scale new campus built by Peking University in recent years, and is also a major strategic deployment of the school for the future. On September 30, Peking University Lanyuan Centre was officially launched. The first dean of Lanyuan Centre is Ke Yang, Professor of Peking University School of Clinical Oncology and a foreign academician of the American Academy of Medical Sciences. In October, Peking University officially announced the establishment of Peking University School of Computer Science, which means the computer major of Peking University was officially upgraded from a department to a school. Yang Fuqing, Academician of the Chinese Academy of Sciences, served as the honorary president. In November, the School of Artificial Intelligence of Peking University was established.

In 2021, “Peking University Campus Nature Reserve” was selected for the “Biodiversity 100+ Global Typical Cases” at the UN Biodiversity Conference (COP15) as the first case of campus nature reserve in China.

In June 2022, the International University Sports Federation (FISU) released the first series of “Healthy Campus” list. Peking University, as the only Chinese university that has obtained platinum certification from the International University Sports Federation, participated in 4 projects and became the only representative from China among 130 projects worldwide.

Campus 

The campus of Peking University was originally located northeast of the Forbidden City in the center of Beijing, and was later moved to the former campus of Yenching University in 1952. The main campus is in northwest Beijing, in Haidian district, near the Summer Palace and the Old Summer Palace; the area is traditionally where many of Beijing's most renowned gardens and palaces were built.

The university campus is on the former site of Qing dynasty imperial gardens and it retains much traditional Chinese-style landscaping, including traditional houses, gardens, pagodas, and many notable historical buildings and structures. The landscape in campus gives a presentation of western styles combined with traditional Chinese aesthetic standards. American architect and art historian Talbot Hamlin designed some of the university's buildings constructed during the 1919 to 1922 period. There are several gates that lead into campus — East, West and South gates, with the West Gate being the most well known for the painted murals on its ceiling. Weiming Lake is in the north of the campus and is surrounded by walking paths and small gardens. The university hosts many museums, such as the Museum of University History and the Arthur M. Sackler Museum of Art and Archaeology.  Notable items in these museums include funerary objects that were excavated in Beijing and date back thousands of years from the graves of royals of the Warring States period. There are ritual pottery vessels as well as elaborate pieces of jewelry on display. There are also human bones set up in the traditional burial style of that period.

Beyond its main campus, Peking University Health Science Center (PKUHSC) is on Xueyuan Road where the country's most distinguished colleges are, and is a fitting site for academics and research.

In 2001, Peking University's Shenzhen campus, the Shenzhen Graduate School, opened its doors. The campus is located in the northwest part of Shenzhen City.

Academics 

Peking University consists of 30 schools and 12 departments, with 125 majors for undergraduates, 2 majors for the second Bachelor's degree, 282 programs for Master's degree candidates and 258 programs for doctoral candidates. In addition to basic research, the university also conducts applied research.

At present, Peking University has 216 research institutions and research centres, including 2 national engineering research centers, 81 key national disciplines, and 12 national key laboratories. With 8 million holdings, the university library is the largest of its kind in Asia.

Peking University, the Georgia Institute of Technology, and Emory University jointly administer the Wallace H. Coulter Department of Biomedical Engineering.  Peking University has become a center for teaching and research, consisting of diverse branches of learning such as pure and applied sciences, social sciences and humanities, and sciences of management and education.

Over the past century, some Peking University alumni have become presidents of other major Chinese universities, including former Tsinghua President Luo Jialun, Renmin University President Yuan Baohua, Zhejiang University President Qian Sanqiang, Fudan University President Zhang Zhirang, Nankai University President Teng Weizao, Chinese University of Science and Technology President Guan Weiyan and many others.

Rankings and reputation

General rankings 

Several rankings have placed Peking University among the top universities in mainland China. In 2015, the Chinese University Alumni Association in partnership with China Education Center considered it first among all Chinese universities.

Typically, Peking University is consistently ranked among the top universities in the Asia-Pacific and the world according to major international university rankings. The joint THE-QS World University Rankings 2006 ranked Peking University 1st in the Asia & Oceania region and 14th in the world.  In 2014, the U.S. News & World Report ranked Peking University 39th in the world, 2nd in the Asia-Pacific and 1st in China. Peking had topped the newly launched Times Higher Education BRICS & Emerging Economies since its inception in 2014.

The 2023 QS Rankings ranked Peking University 12th in the world and first in Asia.  As of 2022, the Times Higher Education World University Rankings ranked Peking University 16th in the world and 1st in China & the Asia-Pacific, with its teaching and research performance indicators placed at 4th and 9th in the world respectively. Peking University was also ranked 15th in the world and 1st in the Asia-Pacific in The Three University Missions Ranking. Academic Ranking of World Universities, also known as the "Shanghai Ranking", placed Peking University 34th in the world, 3rd in Asia, and 2nd in China.  The U.S. News & World Report ranked Peking University 39th in the world, 4th in Asia and 2nd in China.

In the QS Graduate Employability Rankings 2017, an annual ranking of university graduates' employability, Peking University was ranked 11th in the world and 2nd in Asia. In 2019, the QS World University Rankings ranked the university as one of the world's top 20 universities for academic reputation where, it ranked 16 globally, and top 10 in the world and first in the Asia-Pacific for employer reputation. Since 2017, Peking has been placed among the world's top 20 most reputable universities by the Times Higher Education World Reputation Rankings, where it ranked 13 globally in 2022.

Research Performance and Subjects Rankings 
The 2020 CWTS Leiden Ranking ranked Peking University at 8th in the world based on their publications for the time period 2015–2018. For the high quality of research in natural science and life science, Peking University ranked 10th among the leading institutions, and 6th among the leading universities globally in the Nature Index 2022 Annual Tables by Nature Research. In 2020, it ranked 13th among the universities around the world by SCImago Institutions Rankings.

As of 2021, it was ranked 8th globally in "Education", 12th in "Engineering and Technology", 15th in "Physical Science", 17th in "Computer Science", 18th in "Social Science", 19th in "Life Science", 21st in "Arts and Humanities", 22nd in "Business and Economics", 22nd in "Clinical, pre-clinical and Health" and 45th in "Psychology" by the Times Higher Education Rankings by Subjects.

Schools and Institutes

Peking University Library 
On October 24, 2018, Peking University Library, the largest library among Asian universities, held the opening ceremony of the 120th anniversary at the Yingjie Overseas Exchange Center.

Research

Culture 

Peking University has participated in many joint art-research projects, such as the Center for the Art of East Asia (CAEA) with the University of Chicago, and Department of Digital Art and Design with UNESCO.

Peking University partners with Stanford University for its Asian cultural studies programs such as the Stanford Program in Beijing and the Stanford-Peking University Summer Program, which encourages Stanford students interested in exploring Chinese language, history, culture, and society to study on campus at Peking University.

National School of Development (NSD) 
The National School of Development (formerly China Center for Economic Research) is ranked amongst the top five most influential think tanks in China.

In 1998, Justin Yifu Lin et al. jointly founded the Beijing International MBA at Peking University (BiMBA), which is ranked among the top six MBA programs by Quacquarelli Symonds in its TopMBA  ranking of the best MBA programs in Asia Pacific for the year 2014–2015. BiMBA has also been ranked as the second most valuable full-time MBA in China by Forbes (after CEIBS) and among Asia's best business schools by Bloomberg Business.

Peking University Shenzhen Graduate School

Peking University Shenzhen Graduate School is a satellite campus of Peking University located in Shenzhen, Guangdong. It was founded in September, 2001 in collaboration with the Shenzhen Municipal Government and is located in University Town of Shenzhen along with satellite campuses of Tsinghua University and Harbin Institute of Technology. Dr. Wen Hai, a renowned economist in China and the vice-president of Peking University is the present chancellor of PKU Shenzhen. The school houses seven research departments as well as the Peking University HSBC Business School and Peking University School of Transnational Law.

On August 29, 2016, Peking University signed a strategic agreement with the Shenzhen Municipal Government to further develop its Shenzhen Graduate School, the university plans build a brand new campus near the existed graduate school and open undergraduate programs.

International students 
Every year, there are approximately 7,000 international students studying at Peking University. The dormitories for international students at the main campus are located at Shaoyuan Garden (勺园) and Zhongguanyuan Global Village (中关新园). Its international students are made up of students from most countries in the world including most of Western Europe, North America, and South America, Asia, Australia and many countries in Africa.

In 2005, Peking University and Cornell University signed an agreement formally establishing the China and Asia-Pacific Studies major at Cornell, which requires students to spend a semester studying at Peking University while working at internships. In 2006, PKU launched a joint undergraduate program with Yale University in which students will spend a semester overseas, living and studying together with the host institute's students. PKU's School of International Studies also launched joint degree programs with London School of Economics, Paris School of International Affairs, Waseda University, Seoul National University, and the University of Tokyo. PKU also has a longstanding relationship with Stanford University which operates a joint research center and base for Stanford students and scholars at the Stanford Center at Peking University, located in the Lee Jung Sen Building. The Peking University HSBC Business School has joint degree programs with University of Hong Kong and Chinese University of Hong Kong.

The university has maintained a partnership with the Freie Universität Berlin since 1981 and the Higher School of Economics since 2015, and in 2019, became a partner of Washington University in St. Louis through the McDonnell International Scholars Academy.

Global Excellence Strategy 
On the 121st founding anniversary, Peking University unveiled the "Global Excellence Strategy", an international blueprint aiming to enhance Peking University's global presence during the "Fourth Industrial Revolution". The "Global Excellence Strategy" aims to strengthen international cooperation, overcome development barriers, gather global resources, and stimulate collegial relationships. The Global Excellence Strategy is based upon the English word "CLOUDS", representing the "cloud era" of the "Fourth Industrial Revolution". Each letter stands for a corresponding word, namely creativity, leadership, openness, uniqueness, diversity and shaping.

Notable people

Notable alumni 
According to CUAA's 2015 ranking of notable alumni in politics, Peking University has produced the most notable politicians among all universities in China. As of 2017, 88 Peking University alumni currently serve in the government at vice-ministerial positions or higher. Notable alumni include two of the seven member Standing Committee of the CPC, current premier of China Li Keqiang,  and current Secretary of the Central Commission for Discipline Inspection, Zhao Leji. Other alumni in politics include current vice premier of China Hu Chunhua, current minister of Education, Chen Baosheng, current minister of Justice, Current minister of Natural resources, Current Governor of the Central Bank of China, Yi Gang, and former minister of commerce, Bo Xilai.

Notable alumni in the sciences include Nobel laureate Tu Youyou, who for her work in discovering artemisinin and dihydroartemisinin used to treat malaria, was awarded the Nobel Prize in Physiology or Medicine jointly with William C. Campbell and Satoshi Ōmura; nuclear physicists and contributors to Chinese nuclear weapons program Qian Sanqiang and Deng Jiaxian, and "father of the Chinese hydrogen bomb" physicist Yu Min, nuclear physicist Zhu Guangya, particle physicist and discoverer of the partial conservation of the axial current, Zhou Guangzhao; mathematician and MacArthur Fellow Yitang Zhang, neurosurgeon Wang Zhongcheng, pulmonologist and recipient of the Medal of the Republic, Zhong Nanshan, and chief economist of the World Bank, Justin Yifu Lin.

Notable alumni in the humanities and arts include author Lu Xun, philosopher and essayist Hu Shih, polymath Lin Yutang, philosopher Liang Shuming, Qing-dynasty educator Gu Hongming, anthropologist Fei Xiaotong, translator Li Bulou, computer scientist Wang Xuan, and author Jin Yong. Notable international alumni include emeritus professor and linguist Michael Halliday, author Julia Ebner, and philosopher Professor Li Chenyang.

Notable alumni in business include co-founder and CEO of Baidu, billionaire Robin Li, and cryptocurrency entrepreneur Justin Sun.

Other notable alumni include chess grandmaster, four-time Women's World Chess Champion, and Rhodes Scholar Hou Yifan.

Notable academics and staff 
Peking University has benefited from the services of notable academics and staff. These include founder of the People's Republic of China Mao Zedong (who worked as a library staff at the university), educator, politician, and revolutionary Cai Yuanpei (served as Chancellor of Peking University), and others.

See also 

 7072 Beijingdaxue – asteroid named after Peking University
 Affiliated High School of Peking University
 Beijing International MBA
 Beijing Medical University
 China Family Panel Studies
 History of Beijing
 Beijing Guozijian
 Project IMUSE

Notes and references

Further reading 
 Lin, Xiaoqing Diana (2005). Peking University: Chinese Scholarship and Intellectuals, 1898-1937. State University of New York Press. .

External links 

 Official English Website 
  
 Peking University Alumni Association

 
Universities and colleges in Beijing
Project 211
Project 985
Plan 111
Educational institutions established in 1898
Universities and colleges in Haidian District
1898 establishments in China
C9 League
Vice-ministerial universities in China
Ancient universities